Farm & Wilderness, also known as F&W, is a system of eight ACA-accredited Quaker-based summer camps for kids and summer programs for teens rooted in social justice, environmental sustainability, homegrown fun, and wilderness adventure situated in and around Plymouth, Vermont.

Philosophy
F&W has been noted for its stances on a number of social issues, including racial integration, gender equality, and environmentalism. All of the camps practice organic gardening and farming and are certified by the Northeast Organic Farming Association. All of the camps have composting toilets, which they call Kybos, and campers and staff live in three-sided cabins in the woods.

History
F&W was founded by Kenneth and Susan Howard Webb in 1939. The Webbs were influenced by Vermont philosopher and educational reformer, John Dewey.

The first camp was all-boys and was founded in 1939 under the name Mehrlicht, meaning "More Light" in German. After its initial success, the name was changed to Timberlake, and a companion girls camp, Indian Brook, was founded in 1941. Later additions to the group were Tamarack Farm (a work camp for 15- to 17-year-olds of all genders), Saltash Mountain (co-ed, focused on hiking trips), Flying Cloud (for 11- to 14-year-old boys, originally borrowing the traditions of the Lakota people but later creating their own system of wilderness living in the manner of cultures from around the world; originally called "Indian Encampment"), and Barn Day Camp (for 4- to 10-year-old children).

A program called "Questers" was created for those campers who wanted greater challenges in wilderness adventures. The program is based from Saltash Mountain (SAM) and on the trail for the majority of the session on a long trip. Questers have hiked the entire Long Trail (a two-session program), which spans from the southern to northern tip of Vermont. Other one-session Quester adventures typically involve both canoeing and backpacking as well as rock climbing or white water rafting.

After retiring Susan Webb served in the Vermont State Legislature from 1973 to 1980.

Naturism
The Webbs were naturists, so in the beginning the camps were "clothing optional". By the late 1980s nudity was only allowed at the waterfront for swimming. With further social changes and seeking cultural inclusion of those whose religion would not allow it, nudity was banned in 2009.

At Camp Flying Cloud in the 1960s, nudity was more frequent, the campers and counselors otherwise wearing "Indian" breech cloths of their own making. The Flying Cloud program has since moved away from the cultural appropriation of Native Americans.

In a memoir, journalist and podcaster Mark Oppenheimer recounts his experience at Timberlake, the boy's camp, in 1982, when he was eight. The most memorable aspect was nudity, which he found generally positive. While campers were clothed most of the time, swimming in the lake and outdoor showering were always nude, and clothes were not worn when walking from the cabins to these activities.  Tamarack Farm, the coed camp, was also clothing optional at that time.

References

External links
http://www.farmandwilderness.org/

Quakerism in the United States
Summer camps in Vermont
Buildings and structures in Windsor County, Vermont